Koshai ("butcher") is a 1980 Bangladeshi film directed by Amjad Hossain. It stars Rozina, Bobita, Alamgir, Kabari, and Jashim. It won four National Film Awards: Best Supporting Actress (Rozina), Best Music Director (Alauddin Ali), Best Male Playback Singer (Syed Abdul Hadi), and Best Female Playback Singer (Sabina Yasmin).

Cast 
 Bobita
 Kabari
 Rozina
 Jashim
 Alamgir

Music
"Bondhu Tin Din" - Runa Laila
"Amar Doshe Doshi Ami" - Syed Abdul Hadi

Release and reception
The film was screened at the 1980 Moscow International Film Festival.

Writing in 2002, filmmaker Zakir Hossain Raju described Koshai as one of the films of the period that, "bubble with social criticism and satire, which were virtually non-existent earlier".

Awards 
Bangladesh National Film Awards 1980
Best Supporting Actress - Rozina
Best Music Director - Alauddin Ali
Best Male Playback Singer - Syed Abdul Hadi
Best Female Playback Singer - Sabina Yasmin

References

External links
 

1980 films
Bengali-language Bangladeshi films
Films scored by Alauddin Ali
1980s Bengali-language films